Capital punishment is a legal penalty in Guatemala, and is carried out by lethal injection and, to a lesser extent, the firing squad. It is only in military codes of justice, and was abolished for civilian offences in October 2017.

Five executions had been carried out since 1983; all were broadcast live on television. The last executions took place on June 29, 2000, when kidnappers and murderers Amilcar Cetino Perez and Tomas Cerrate Hernandez were executed by lethal injection on live television.

From 2005 to 2012, the sentences of all 54 inmates condemned to death were commuted to life in prison. There are currently no inmates on death row in Guatemala.

Guatemala voted in favor of the UN Moratorium on the Death Penalty in 2007, 2010, 2012, 2014, and 2016. The country abstained from voting in 2008.

In 2017, Guatemala abolished the death penalty for civil crimes. Currently, the death penalty can only be applied in times of war. Guatemala is one of seven countries that has abolished capital punishment for ordinary crimes only.

The current President of Guatemala, Alejandro Giammattei, supports the death penalty. Jimmy Morales, president from 2015 to 2019, also voiced support for the death penalty.

Executions since 1983

External links
 Laws of Guatemala
 Execution chamber in Guatemala
 "The Death Penalty in Guatemala: On the road towards abolition" (Archive). International Federation for Human Rights.
 "Guatamala: [sic] First Ever Execution By Lethal Injection Carried Out - 1998". Associated Press.
 "Guatemala - Man executed by lethal injection". Associated Press.
 "Guatemala - Two men executed for rape and murder - 1996 ". Associated Press.
 "GUATEMALA: KIDNAPPERS KILLED BY LETHAL INJECTION". Associated Press.
 Inter Press Service | News and Views from the Global South
 HANDS OFF CAIN against death penalty in the world

References

 

Guatemala
Law enforcement in Guatemala
Murder in Guatemala
Human rights abuses in Guatemala